Robert Medaris "Rus" Lindsay (February 17, 1891 – March 2, 1977) was a college football and baseball player for the Tennessee Volunteers of the University of Tennessee.

University of Tennessee
His son is the namesake of Robert M. Lindsay Field at Lindsey Nelson Stadium, where Tennessee plays baseball.

Football
Lindsay was a  prominent fullback for the Tennessee Volunteers football team.

1914
He was a member of the Southern Intercollegiate Athletic Association champion 1914 team, selected All-Southern. It was the first championship of any kind for the Tennessee program.  Winning all nine of their games, the 1914 squad was only the second undefeated team in Tennessee history.  The 1914 Vols were retroactively awarded a national championship by 1st-N-Goal, though this remains largely unrecognized. A description of the 14 to 7 win over Sewanee in 1914 read, "Lindsay, as usual, ploughed through the opposing line for consistent gains, and when it was absolutely necessary that Tennessee gain a certain number of yards 'Russ' was sure to be called upon."

Baseball
He was an All-Southern baseball player as well.

References

External links

1891 births
1977 deaths
Tennessee Volunteers football players
American football fullbacks
Players of American football from Knoxville, Tennessee
All-Southern college football players
Tennessee Volunteers baseball players
Baseball players from Knoxville, Tennessee